Modoc National Forest is a   U.S. national forest in Northeastern California.

Geography
The Modoc National Forest protects parts of Modoc (82.9% of acreage), Lassen (9.4%), and Siskiyou (7.7%) counties. Most of the forest was covered by immense lava flows occurring over the last 500,000 years.

The eastern part of the forest east of Alturas contains the Warner Mountains. The Warner Mountains drop steeply on the eastern slopes, whereas the western flank has a more gentle topography.

Ecology

Due to the elevation and precipitation differences, the forests hosts a large number of plant species. The western side of the brushy foothills consist mostly of bitterbrush and curl-leaf mahogany. As elevation increases, forests of ponderosa pine, white and red firs, incense cedar, and aspen give way to lodgepole and western white pines sprinkle towards the summit. Some  of the forest have been identified as old growth, with lodgepole pine, ponderosa pine, white fir, incense cedar, and red fir being common constituents.

History
Modoc National Forest was established as the Modoc Forest Reserve on November 29, 1904, by the General Land Office. It was named for the Modoc people who traditionally had their territory in this area. In 1905 federal forests were transferred to the U.S. Forest Service, and on March 4, 1907, they became National Forests. On July 1, 1908 Warner Mountains National Forest was added to Modoc. The South Warner Wilderness lies within the forest.

Management
Forest headquarters are located in Alturas, California. There are local ranger district offices located in Adin, Alturas, Cedarville, and Tulelake.

See also
List of plants on the Modoc National Forest

References

External links

 Official Modoc National Forest website
 CERES - Overview of the Modoc Bioregion
  Don Bain's VirtualGuidebooks to Mount Lassen and the Modoc Plateau

 
National Forests of California
Modoc Plateau
California placenames of Native American origin
Protected areas of Lassen County, California
Protected areas of Modoc County, California
Protected areas of Siskiyou County, California
1904 establishments in California
Protected areas established in 1904